Carlo de Tocco (11 August 1592 - 14 February 1674), titular Duke of Leucada and Prince of Montemiletto, was an Italian aristocrat, nobleman and military officer.

Biography
Tocco was born into the Tocco family that had previously ruled the Republic of Genoa during the 14th century and the Despotate of Epirus during the 15th century.
His father was Giovanni di Tocco, consignore di Refrancore and his grandfather Leonardo IV Tocco.

Tocco fought during the 30 Years' War for the Holy Roman Empire. In 1642 he was made a Knight of the Order of the Golden Fleece.

References

Sources 

 
 

1592 births
1674 deaths
Carlo
17th-century Italian nobility
Knights of the Golden Fleece
Italian people of the Thirty Years' War
Year of birth unknown
17th-century Italian military personnel